Jeff Gordon (JG) Mair is a Canadian new-media virtual artist and mixed-media visual artist who combines elements of painting, installation and the web in his work. Mair currently lives and works in Vancouver, British Columbia.

Career
JG Mair studied Fine Art at the University of Victoria and Art Education at the University of British Columbia.

Mair's work combines digital and traditional media to pursue themes of control, data and resources and prompts viewers to reflect on the information-based society in which they are immersed.
JG Mair has exhibited in Canada, U.S.A. and Japan.

Ars Scientia

In 2023 Mair was an invited artist in residence at University of British Columbia's Ars Scientia program, a tripartite partnership fusing arts and science in the emergent fields of interdisciplinary research between UBC’s Stewart Blusson Quantum Matter Institute (Blusson QMI), the  Department of Physics and Astronomy and The Morris and Helen Belkin Art Gallery. As part of his residency Mair collaborated with SBQMI Condensed Matter Physicist Alannah Hallas by mixing paint medium with quantum materials in order to produce paintings.

Works
urbatory
pairograms
release/aftershock
thought control
site[d]  
Utopian Dystopia

References

External links
 JG Mair's web site
 Georgia Straight review of "Between the Lines" group exhibition

Artists from British Columbia
People from Cranbrook, British Columbia
University of Victoria alumni
University of British Columbia alumni